Ion Cazacliu (born in 1869, Cușelăuca, Șoldănești District, Bessarabia - died in 1933, Chişinău) official, Romanian politician, member of the Moldovan Parliament.

Biography 
He served as Member of the Moldovan Parliament (1917–1918). The Cazacliu family played an important role in the Great Union; Ion Cazacliu was the uncle of Grigore Cazacliu and Vladimir Cazacliu (the two, Grigore and Vladimir were brothers).

Gallery

Bibliography 
Gheorghe E. Cojocaru, Sfatul Țării: itinerar, Civitas, Chişinău, 1998, 
Mihai Taşcă, Sfatul Țării şi actualele autorităţi locale, "Timpul de dimineaţă", no. 114 (849), June 27, 2008 (page 16)

External links 
 Arhiva pentru Sfatul Tarii
 Deputaţii Sfatului Ţării şi Lavrenti Beria

Notes

1870 births
1933 deaths
People from Șoldănești District
People from Soroksky Uyezd
Moldovan MPs 1917–1918
Romanian people of Moldovan descent